Pīr Kanthi is located in Bagh District, Azad Kashmir, in the mountains of the Pir Panjal Range.

At Sudhan Gali, visitors who arrive by car can park and walk to the top of the path that leads to Shar Comp. Although mountaineering is fairly easy hike to the peak, climbers have been killed in storms. At this peak, hikers can see views of the Himalayan mountains. The water comes from the mountain Jhelum River.

References

Populated places in Bagh District